The East Lancs Kinetec is a type of low-floor bus body for single- and double-decker MAN Truck & Bus chassis. Both variants were launched at Euro Bus Expo 2006.

Kinetec (single decker)
The standard Kinetec is a single-decker bus body that appears to have been influenced by the Optare Sigma body in styling and construction. Unlike the Sigma though it is of low floor design. Reviews from its launch in Euro Bus Expo 2006 were very poor. Like the Scania OmniTown the bus uses the East Lancs Esteem body, but with the chassis maker's (MAN's) Lion's City front.

Stagecoach West Scotland ordered ten Kinetecs on MAN 18.240 chassis to join its existing fleet of older Alexander ALX300-bodied MAN 18.220s.

Kinetec+ (double decker)
The Kinetec+ is a double-decker bus seemingly influenced by the Optare Spectra body, with an improved MAN ND283F (A48) chassis. The first prototype body has a low-height (4 metres) design under EU regulations, but which has been criticised. Another prototype in London specification with a 4.3 metre height had been planned, but this had not materialised.

Like later Spectras, the body is of low floor design and has the same lower dash panel as the single decker Kinetec. Like the Kinetec, this bus again uses the chassis maker's front with the East Lancs Olympus body.

Naming
Both the Kinetec and Kinetec+ were placed on display at the Euro Bus Expo 2006 with "KINETEC" lettering, but with plates bearing the alternative spelling "KINETIC". The LED displays also showed the name with an "I". This has inevitably led to some uncertainty as to the correct spelling of the model name.

See also 

 List of buses

References

External links

Kinetic
Double-decker buses
Low-floor buses
Vehicles introduced in 2006